Marlon Barnes (born March 13, 1976, in Memphis, Tennessee) is a former American football running back for the Chicago Bears of the NFL.  He attended the University of Colorado.

1976 births
Living people
Players of American football from Memphis, Tennessee
American football running backs
Colorado Buffaloes football players
Chicago Bears players